A list of notable events in music that took place in the year 1976.



Specific locations
1976 in British music
1976 in Norwegian music

Specific genres
1976 in country music
1976 in heavy metal music
1976 in jazz

Events

January–February
January 5 – Former Beatles road manager Mal Evans is shot dead by Los Angeles police after refusing to drop what police only later determine is an air rifle.
January 6 – Peter Frampton releases his live album Frampton Comes Alive!
January 7 – Kenneth Moss, a former record company executive, is sentenced to 120 days in the Los Angeles County Jail and four years probation for involuntary manslaughter in the 1974 drug-induced death of Average White Band drummer Robbie McIntosh.
January 13 – A trial begins for seven Brunswick Records and Dakar Records employees. The record company employees are charged with stealing more than $184,000 in royalties from artists.
January 19 – Concert promoter Bill Sargent makes an offer of $30 million to the Beatles if they will reunite for a concert.
February 15 – Bette Midler bails seven members of her entourage out of jail after they are arrested on charges of cocaine and marijuana possession.
February 19 – Former Tower of Power lead singer Rick Stevens is arrested and charged with the drug-related murders of three men in San Jose, California.
February 20 – Kiss have their footprints added to the sidewalk outside Hollywood's Grauman's Chinese Theatre.
February 24 – Released one week before, Eagles' Their Greatest Hits (1971–1975) compilation becomes the first album certified platinum by the RIAA. The new platinum certification represents sales of at least 1 million copies for albums and 2 million copies for singles. Globally, it will become probably the second best-selling album of all time.
February 28 – The 18th Annual Grammy Awards are presented in Los Angeles, hosted by Andy Williams. Paul Simon's Still Crazy After All These Years wins Album of the Year, Captain & Tennille's "Love Will Keep Us Together" wins Record of the Year and Judy Collins' version of "Send in the Clowns" wins Song of the Year. Natalie Cole wins Best New Artist.

March–April
March 4 – ABBA arrive at Sydney airport for a promotional tour in Australia.
March 6 – EMI Records reissues all 22 previously released British Beatles singles, plus a new single of the classic "Yesterday". All 23 singles hit the UK charts at the same time.
March 7 – A wax likeness of Elton John is put on display in London's Madame Tussaud's Wax Museum.
March 9 – The Who's Keith Moon collapses onstage ten minutes into a performance at the Boston Garden.
March 15 – Members of The Plastic People of the Universe are arrested in communist Czechoslovakia. They were sentenced from 8 to 18 months in jail.
March 20 – Alice Cooper marries Sheryl Goddard in an Acapulco restaurant.
March 25 – Jackson Browne's wife Phyllis commits suicide.
March 26 – In Paris, France, Wings guitarist Jimmy McCulloch breaks one of his fingers when he slips in his hotel bathroom following the final performance on the band's European tour. The injury ended up delaying the band's United States tour by three weeks.
April 3 – British pop group Brotherhood of Man win the 21st Eurovision Song Contest in The Hague, Netherlands, with the song "Save Your Kisses For Me". It goes on to be the biggest selling Eurovision winner ever.
April 14 – Stevie Wonder announces that he has signed a "$13 million-plus" contract with Motown Records.
April 23 – The Ramones release their eponymous debut studio album, Ramones.
April 24 – Saturday Night Live producer Lorne Michaels makes a semi-serious on-air offer to pay the Beatles $3000 to reunite live on the show. In a 1980 interview, John Lennon stated that he and Paul McCartney happened to be watching the show together at Lennon's apartment in New York and considered walking down to the SNL studio "for a gag" but were "too tired". On May 22, Michaels raises his offer from $3,000 to $3,200.
April 28 – The Rolling Stones open their European tour in Frankfurt, Germany.
April 29 – When his tour stops in Memphis, Tennessee, Bruce Springsteen jumps the wall at Elvis Presley's mansion, "Graceland", in an attempt to see his idol. Security guards stop Springsteen and escort him off the grounds.

May–June
May 1 – The Alan Parsons Project release their debut studio album, Tales of Mystery and Imagination.
May 3
Paul McCartney and Wings start their Wings over America Tour in Fort Worth, Texas. This is the first time McCartney has performed in the US since The Beatles' last concert in 1966 at Candlestick Park.
Paul Simon puts together a benefit show at Madison Square Garden to raise money for the New York Public Library. Phoebe Snow, Jimmy Cliff and the Brecker Brothers also perform. The concert brings in over $30,000 for the Library.
May 19
Rolling Stones guitarist Keith Richards is involved in a car accident northwest of London. Cocaine is found in his wrecked car. Richards is given a court date of January 12, 1977.
Rumour spread by German press: ABBA members killed in plane crash, only Anni-Frid survived.
May 25 – Bob Dylan's Rolling Thunder Revue tour ends.
 June – Former Spring Canyon keyboardist Mark Cook joins Daniel Amos.
June 6 – Keith Richards and Anita Pallenberg suffer tragedy when their 10-week-old son Tara dies of respiratory failure.
June 10 – Alice Cooper collapses and is rushed to UCLA Hospital in Los Angeles, three weeks before the Goes To Hell tour would begin. The tour is cancelled.
June 18 – ABBA perform "Dancing Queen" for the first time on Swedish television in Stockholm on the eve of the wedding of King Carl XVI Gustaf to Silvia Sommerlath.
June 25 – Uriah Heep performs its last show with David Byron as lead singer in Bilbao, Spain. Byron is sacked shortly afterward.

July–August
July 2
Composer Benjamin Britten accepts a life peerage, only a few months before his death.
Brian Wilson performs on stage with The Beach Boys for the first time in three years at a Day on the Green concert in Oakland, California.
July 4 – Many outdoor festivals and shows are held all over the United States as the country celebrates its bicentennial. Elton John performs for 62,000 at Shaffer Stadium in Foxboro, Massachusetts, while The Eagles and Fleetwood Mac play for 36,000 at Tampa Stadium, Lynyrd Skynyrd and ZZ Top draw 35,000 at Memphis Memorial Stadium and Elvis Presley performs for 11,974 at the Mabee Center in Tulsa, Oklahoma.
July 7 – 50,000 fans brave the rain in New York to attend a free Jefferson Starship concert in Central Park.
July 27 – Tina Turner files for divorce from husband Ike.
August 5 – Eric Clapton provokes an uproar over comments he makes on stage at a Birmingham concert, voicing his opposition to immigration using multiple racial slurs while exhorting the audience to support Enoch Powell and to "keep Britain white".
August 11 – Keith Moon is rushed to hospital for the second time in five months, collapsing after trashing his Miami hotel room.
August 13 – The official ABBA logo with the reversed 'B' is adopted.
August 16 – Cliff Richard becomes one of the first Western artists ever to perform in the Soviet Union when he gives a concert in Leningrad.
August 21 – An estimated 120,000 fans pack Knebworth House to see The Rolling Stones. Todd Rundgren, Lynyrd Skynyrd and 10cc also perform.
August 25 – Boston release their eponymous debut studio album, Boston.
August 31 – A U.S. district court decision rules that George Harrison had "subconsciously" copied The Chiffons' hit "He's So Fine" when he wrote the song "My Sweet Lord".

September–October
September 1 – Ode Records president Lou Adler is kidnapped at his Malibu home and released eight hours later after a $25,000 ransom is paid. Two suspects are soon arrested.
September 3 – Rory Gallagher joins the short list of Western popular musicians to perform behind the Iron Curtain with a show in Warsaw, Poland.
September 8 – In a candid interview appearing in the October 7 edition of Rolling Stone published today, Elton John publicly discloses his bisexuality for the first time.
September 14 – The one-hour Bob Dylan concert special Hard Rain airs on NBC, coinciding with the release of the live album of the same name.
September 18
Queen performs a massive free concert at London's Hyde Park for over 150,000 people.
The second annual Rock Music Awards air on CBS. Peter Frampton wins Rock Personality of the Year, while Fleetwood Mac wins for Best Group and Best Album.
September 20-21 – 100 Club Punk Festival, the first international punk festival is held in London. Siouxsie and the Banshees play their first concert.
September 25 – Bono, The Edge, Adam Clayton and Larry Mullen Jr. form a band called Feedback in Dublin. The band would later be renamed U2.
October 2 – Joe Cocker performs a duet of "Feelin' Alright" with himself (as portrayed by John Belushi) on Saturday Night Live.
October 8 – English punk rock group the Sex Pistols sign a contract with EMI Records.
October 11 – Irish singer Joe Dolan is banned for life by Aer Lingus after an air rage incident en route to Corfu from Dublin.
October 20 – The Led Zeppelin concert film The Song Remains the Same premieres at Cinema I in New York.
October 22 - The Damned releases their debut single “New Rose”, considered to be the first release from a British punk group.
October 31 – George Clinton and Parliament Funkadelic begin "The P-Funk/Rubber Band Earth Tour" in Houston, a national live series highlighting one of the biggest and revolutionary stage shows in the history of the music industry (the rock group Kiss would be the other group to do a similar act), relying on elaborate costumes, special lighting and effects, and extremely large props including "the Mothership", which would arrive and land on stage, all of what this band is generally known for. This live set would vary in length (on average of 3 to 5 hours long) and at high volume.

November–December
November 18 – Former Tower of Power lead singer Rick Stevens and another person are found guilty on two counts of murder.
November 23
Thin Lizzy are forced to cancel their U.S. tour when guitarist Brian Robertson injures his hand in a bar fight.
Jerry Lee Lewis is arrested after showing up drunk outside Graceland at 3 a.m., waving a pistol and loudly demanding to see Elvis Presley. Presley has declined his request.
November 25 – The Band gives its last public performance; Martin Scorsese is on hand to film it.
November 26 – The Sex Pistols' debut single "Anarchy in the U.K." is released by EMI.
December 1 – The Sex Pistols appear on Thames Television's Today show as a last-minute replacement for Queen. The group causes a national outcry after swearing on the show.
December 2 – The Bee Gees perform at Madison Square Garden and donate the proceeds to the Police Athletic League in New York. In January 1979, they will receive the Police Athletic League's "Superstars of the Year" award.
December 3
A Pink Floyd album cover shoot in South London goes awry when a large inflatable pig balloon being used for the shoot breaks free of its moorings and drifts out of sight.
Attempted assassination of Bob Marley (with his manager Don Taylor and others) in a shooting at his home in Kingston, Jamaica.
December 8
The Carpenters air their "Very First Television Special" on ABC.
The Eagles release Hotel California. Globally, it will become the third best-selling album of all time, behind the same band's February-released Greatest Hits compilation.
December 12 – Ace Frehley is shocked on stage during a Kiss concert in Lakeland, Florida after touching an ungrounded metal railing. The incident inspires the song "Shock Me".
December 31 – The fifth annual New Year's Rockin' Eve special airs on ABC, with performances by Donna Summer, Bachman-Turner Overdrive, The Four Seasons, and KC and the Sunshine Band.

Also in 1976
 The last practitioner of the rekuhkara form of throat-singing dies, in Hokkaido, Japan.
 Tenor Franco Corelli retires from the stage at the age of 55.
 Cheryl Byron performs rapso in calypso tents for the first time, beginning the popularization of rapso.
 Peter Brown's solo career begins.
 Peter Tosh's solo career begins.
 Bunny Wailer's solo career begins.
 Leif Garrett's solo career begins.
 .38 Special's musical career begins.
 Y&T (Yesterday & Today)'s musical career begins.
 Sergio Franchi becomes TV spokesman for Chrysler Corporation's Plymouth "Volare" and media spokesman for Hills Brothers coffee.
 Steve Martin signs a contract with Warner Bros.
 Eddie Money signs a contract with CBS.
 "Ten Percent", by Double Exposure, becomes the first 12-inch single commercially available to the public (as opposed to DJ-only promotional copies).
 The Chinese Music Society of North America is founded.
 Gabin Dabiré embarks on a tour of Italy.

Bands formed
See Musical groups established in 1976

Bands reformed
The Pirates

Bands disbanded
See Musical groups disestablished in 1976

Albums released

January

February

March

April

May

June

July

August

September

October

November

December

Release date unknown

 20 Magnificent Songs – Sergio Franchi
 20th Anniversary of Rock 'n' Roll – Bo Diddley
 After Hours – Little River Band
 After the Dust Settles – Juice Newton and Silver Spur
 Andy Irvine/Paul Brady 
 The Art of Tea Michael Franks
 At the Sound of the Bell – Pavlov's Dog
 Automatic Man – Automatic Man
 Basie Jam 2 – Count Basie
 Basie Jam 3 – Count Basie
 The Book of Invasions – Horslips
 Both Sides of Ray Stevens – Ray Stevens
 Brass Construction II – Brass Construction
 Broken Glass – Broken Glass
 Bright Size Life – Pat Metheny
 Chicken Skin Music – Ry Cooder
 City Boy – City Boy
 Coup de chapeau au passé – Dalida
 Cry Tough – Nils Lofgren
 Daniel Amos – Daniel Amos
 The David Grisman Rounder Record - David Grisman
 David Soul – David Soul
 Disco Train – Donny Osmond
 Dr. Buzzard's Original Savannah Band – Dr. Buzzard's Original Savannah Band
 The Early Show – Art Pepper
 Ella and Oscar – Ella Fitzgerald, Oscar Peterson
 Everybody Loves the Sunshine – Roy Ayers
 Everyday of My Life – Michael Bolton
 Fitzgerald and Pass... Again – Ella Fitzgerald, Joe Pass
 Fly with the Wind – McCoy Tyner
 Flyin' High – Blackfoot
 Focal Point – McCoy Tyner
 From My Private Collection – Sergio Con Amore – Sergio Franchi
 Good High – Brick
 Good Morning – Daevid Allen
 Greatest Hits – War
 Happy to Be... – Demis Roussos
 Helluva Band – Angel 
 Hit the Road Jack – Big Youth
 Homecooking - Sérgio Mendes
 Hot (I Need to Be Loved, Loved, Loved) – James Brown
 Hot Tracks – Nazareth
 I Told You So – Count Basie
 In the Falling Dark – Bruce Cockburn
 It's a Good Night for Singing – Jerry Jeff Walker
 Jammy Smears – Ivor Cutler
 Just a Matter of Time - Marlena Shaw
 Kites – Jade Warrior
Krokus – Krokus
 L – Steve Hillage
 La Düsseldorf – La Düsseldorf
 Late General Murtala Ramat Mohammed – Salawa Abeni
 Legalize It – Peter Tosh
 Life & Times – Billy Cobham
 A Little Bit More – Dr. Hook & The Medicine Show
 Lone Star – Lone Star
 Look My Way – Rosemary Clooney

 Look Out for#1 – The Brothers Johnson
 Love To The World – L.T.D.
 Mahogany Rush IV – Mahogany Rush
 Man to Man – Hot Chocolate
 The Manhattans – The Manhattans
 Marriott – Steve Marriott
 Max Webster – Max Webster
 Message in the Music – The O'Jays
 Metallic K.O. – The Stooges – Live 1973–'74
Mind Exploding – Lucifer's Friend
 Misty – Ray Stevens
 Mondo Deco – The Quick
 More, More, More – Andrea True Connection
 Mother Earth's Plantasia – Mort Garson
 Moxy II – Moxy
 Music from the Penguin Cafe – Penguin Cafe Orchestra
 Mysteries - Keith Jarrett
 Natty Cultural Dread – Big Youth
 No Rest for the Wicked – Truth and Janey
 Nobody Knows What You Do - John Hartford
 Octoberon – Barclay James Harvest
 A Parcel of Rogues – The Dubliners
 Pangaea – Miles Davis – Live
 Passport – Nana Mouskouri
 Ports of the Heart – Jimmie Spheeris
 Ratcity in Blue – Good Rats
 Right Time – Mighty Diamonds
 Ripper '76 – Various Artists
 Roadhawks – Hawkwind
 Robin Trower Live – Robin Trower 
 R-O-C-K – Bill Haley & His Comets
 Rocket Cottage – Steeleye Span
 Romantic Warrior – Return to Forever
 Satisfied 'n Tickled Too - Taj Mahal
 School Days – Stanley Clarke 
 Seed of Memory – Terry Reid
 Sergio Franchi – Sergio Franchi (TeleHouse album)
 Sergio Franchi Sings Volare – Sergio Franchi (Chrysler Corp. Promo)
 Shades - Keith Jarrett
 Ship of Memories – Focus
 Song of Joy – Captain & Tennille
 Southern Tracks & Fantasies – Paul Davis
 Sowiesoso – Cluster
 Starland Vocal Band – Starland Vocal Band
 Still Shakin''' – Flamin' Groovies
 A Street Called Straight – Roy Buchanan
 Streetheart – Dion
 Teenage Depression – Eddie and the Hot Rods
 This Is Sergio Franchi – Sergio Franchi (compilation)
 Timeless Flight – Steve Harley & Cockney Rebel
 Trenchtown Mix Up – The Gladiators
 Von Herz zu Herz – Die Flippers
 The Wild Tchoupitoulas – The Meters, George & Amos Landry, The Neville Brothers
 Yesterday and Today – Y&T (debut)
 Zombie – Fela Kuti

Biggest hit singles
The following songs achieved the highest chart positions
in the charts of 1976.

Chronological table of US and UK number one hit singles

Top 40 Chart hit singles

Other Chart hit singles

Notable singles

Other Notable singles

Published popular music
 "Always and Forever"     w.m. Rod Temperton
 "Dancing Queen"     w.m. Benny Andersson, Stig Anderson & Björn Ulvaeus
 "Devil Woman"     w.m. Terry Britten & Christine Authors
 "Don't Cry for Me, Argentina" w. Tim Rice m. Andrew Lloyd Webber
 "Don't It Make My Brown Eyes Blue" w.m. Richard Leigh
 "Evergreen"     w. Paul Williams m. Barbra Streisand
 "Fernando"     w.m. Benny Andersson, Stig Anderson & Björn Ulvaeus
 "Gonna Fly Now" (aka "Theme From Rocky")      w. Carol Connors & Ayn Robbins m. Bill Conti
 "I Never Do Anything Twice" aka "The Madam's Song" w.m. Stephen Sondheim. Introduced by Régine in the film The Seven-Per-Cent Solution "Isn't She Lovely?"     w.m. Stevie Wonder
 "Like A Sad Song"     w.m. John Denver
 "A Little Bit More"     w.m. Bobby Gosh
 "Making Our Dreams Come True" w.m. Norman Gimbel & Charles Fox, from the TV series Laverne and Shirley "Money, Money, Money"     w.m. Benny Andersson & Björn Ulvaeus
 "Sorry Seems To Be The Hardest Word"     w.m.Elton John
 "Welcome Back" w.m. John Sebastian.  Theme song from the television series Welcome Back KotterOther notable songs
"Djambo, Djambo" w.m. Peter Reber
"El Pasadiscos" w.m. Diego Verdaguer
"Kabhi Kabhie Mere Dil Mein" w. Sahir Ludhianvi m. Khayyam

Classical music

 Geoffrey Burgon – Requiem
 Elliott Carter – A Symphony of Three Orchestras Brian Cherney – String Trio
 George CrumbDream Sequence (Images II) for violin, cello, piano, percussion (one player), and off-stage glass harmonica (two players)Night Music I (1963, revised 1976) for soprano, piano/celeste, and two percussionists
 Mario Davidovsky – String Quartet No. 3
 Henri Dutilleux – Ainsi la nuit Einar Englund – Symphony No. 4 Nostalgic (in memory of Shostakovich)
 Morton Feldman
 Elemental Procedures, for soprano, choir, and orchestra
 Oboe and Orchestra Orchestra Routine Investigations, for oboe, trumpet, piano, viola, cello, and double-bass
 Voice, Violin and Piano, for female voice, violin, and piano
 Lorenzo FerreroLe néant où l'on ne peut arriverRomanza senza parole Henryk Górecki – Symphony No. 3 Symphony of Sorrowful Songs Gérard Grisey - Partiels for 18 instruments
 Nicolaus A. Huber – Darabukka for piano
 Wojciech Kilar – Kościelec 1909 for orchestra
 Ib Nørholm – Sonata No. 1, Op. 69, for guitar
 Krzysztof Penderecki – Violin Concerto No. 1
 Carmen Petra Basacopol – Sonata for flute and harp
 John Serry Sr. – Falling Leaves for piano
 Karlheinz Stockhausen – Amour Manfred Trojahn
 Architectura caelestis for vocalists and orchestra
 String Quartet No. 1

Opera
 Peter Maxwell Davies – The Martyrdom of St Magnus Carlisle Floyd – Bilby's Doll Philip Glass – Einstein on the BeachJazz

Musical theater
 Bubbling Brown Sugar – Broadway production opened at the ANTA Playhouse and ran for 766 performances
 Fiddler on the Roof (Jerry Bock and Sheldon Harnick) – Broadway revival
 Guys and Dolls – Broadway revival
 Irene – London revival
 My Fair Lady (Alan Jay Lerner and Frederick Loewe) – Broadway revival
 Oh Calcutta – Broadway revival
 Porgy and Bess – Broadway revival
 Salad Days (Julian Slade) – London revival
 Side by Side by Sondheim – London production
 Starmania- French Quebec rock opera
 The Threepenny Opera (Bertolt Brecht and Kurt Weill) – Broadway revival

Musical films
 The Blank Generation Bound for Glory Bugsy Malone Dus Numbri Hera Pheri Leadbelly The Slipper and the Rose The Song Remains the Same – Led Zeppelin
 A Star Is Born That's Entertainment, Part IIBirths
January 8
 Jenny Lewis,  American singer-songwriter, musician, and actress. (Rilo Kiley)
 Karen Poole, English singer-songwriter, producer
January 9 – Hayes Carll, American singer-songwriter and guitarist
January 12 – Melanie C, English singer, songwriter, entrepreneur, actress, stage actress, and television personality (Spice Girls) 
January 13 – Bic Runga, New Zealand singer-songwriter and multi-instrumentalist pop artist
January 16 – Stuart Fletcher (The Seahorses)
January 18 – Damien Leith, Australian singer/songwriter
January 20 – Sid Wilson (Slipknot)
January 21 – Emma Bunton, English singer, songwriter, actress, and radio and television presenter.(Spice Girls)
January 23 – Tony Lucca, American singer-songwriter, producer and actor
January 29 
 Chris Castle, American singer-songwriter and guitarist
 Belle Perez, Belgian-Spanish musician and songwriter. 
February 4 – Cam'ron, American rapper
February 13 – Leslie Feist, known professionally as Feist, is a Canadian indie pop singer-songwriter and guitarist (Broken Social Scene)
February 15
 Brandon Boyd (Incubus)
 Ronnie Vannucci, Jr. (The Killers)
February 28 – Ja Rule, American rapper
March 8 – Gareth Coombes, British singer (Supergrass)
March 16 – Blu Cantrell, American soul singer-songwriter
March 17 – Stephen Gately, Irish singer (Boyzone) (d. 2009)
March 20 – Chester Bennington, American singer-songwriter, producer, musician (Linkin Park) (d. 2017)
March 23 – Keri Russell, American dancer and actor
March 26 – Dave Keuning (The Killers)
April 2 – Lucy Diakovska, German-Bulgarian pop singer
April 10 – Jan Werner Danielsen, Norwegian singer (d. 2006)
April 18 – Sean Maguire, British actor and singer
April 23 - Aaron Dessner, American musician, songwriter, and record producer 
April 29 – Jay Orpin, Swedish composer and record producer
May 8
Martha Wainwright, singer-songwriter, daughter of Loudon Wainwright III and Kate McGarrigle
Ian "H" Watkins, British singer (Steps)
May 10 – Udo Mechels, Belgian singer
May 14 – Hunter Burgan (AFI)
May 17 – Kandi Burruss, American singer-songwriter, musician, and business woman (Xscape)
May 22 – Daniel Erlandsson, Swedish drummer (Arch Enemy)
May 25 - Cillian Murphy, is an Irish actor. He was the lead singer, guitarist, and lyricist of the rock band The Sons of Mr. Green Genes.
May 29 – Dave Buckner (Papa Roach)
June 2
Tim Rice-Oxley, British musician (Keane)
Adrian Olivares (Menudo)
June 6 – Emilie-Claire Barlow, Canadian singer-songwriter and actress
June 7 – Necro (Ron Braunstein), American rapper and record producer
June 11 – Tai Anderson, American rock bassist (Third Day)
June 13
Jason "J" Brown, English rock musician (5ive)
Kym Marsh, English singer (Hear'Say)
June 15
Gary Lightbody, Northern Irish rock musician and songwriter (Snow Patrol)
Dryden Mitchell (Alien Ant Farm)
June 18 – Blake Shelton, American singer-songwriter and guitarist 
June 19 – Scott Avett, American folk-rock singer-songwriter and musician 
June 20 – Jerome Fontamillas, American singer and guitarist (Switchfoot, Mortal and Fold Zandura)
June 21 – Mike Einziger (Incubus)
June 22 – Gordon Moakes (Bloc Party)
June 23 – Joe Becker, American guitarist and composer
June 26 – Paul Phillips, guitarist (Puddle of Mudd)
June 27 – Leigh Nash, American singer (Sixpence None the Richer)
July 1
Justin Lo, Hong Kong singer and actor
Plies, American rapper
July 3 – Shane Lynch, Irish singer (Boyzone)
July 5
Bizarre, African American rapper
Mike DeWolf, American rock musician (Taproot)
July 10 – Elijah Blue Allman, American musician, son of Cher and Gregg Allman
July 12 – Tracie Spencer, American singer-songwriter and actress
July 16 – Chiara Zeffirelli, crossover soprano
July 20 – Andrew Stockdale, Australian rock singer/guitarist (Wolfmother)
July 22 – Kokia, Japanese singer-songwriter
July 23 - Terrance Zdunich, American artist, singer, actor, writer, composer, producer, illustrator and storyboard artist. (Emilie Autumn, Alexa PenaVega, Tech N9ne, Saar Hendelman) 
 July 24 - Johnny McDaid, Northern Irish singer, songwriter, musician and record producer (Partner of Courtney Cox, member of Snow Patrol) 
August 8
 JC Chasez, American singer, songwriter, dancer, record producer, and occasional actor (*NSYNC)
 Drew Lachey, American singer (98 Degrees)
 August 9, Rhona Mitra, English actress, singer-songwriter, and model
August 11
Brendan Bayliss, American  rock guitarist and vocalist
Ben Gibbard, American rock musician (Death Cab for Cutie, The Postal Service)
August 12
Mikko Lindström, Finnish rock guitarist
Wednesday 13, American rock lead singer (Murderdolls, FDQ)
Lina Rafn, Danish singer
August 13 – Roddy Woomble, Scottish musician
August 14 – Maya Nasri, Lebanese actress and singer
August 18 – Alex Katunich, (Incubus)
September 1 – Angaleena Presley,  American country music singer-songwriter. (She is a member of the female country trio Pistol Annies)
September 12 – Bizzy Bone, American rapper, member of Bone Thugs-n-Harmony
September 16
Tina Barrett, British singer-songwriter, actor, and dancer (S Club 7)
Elīna Garanča,  Latvian operatic mezzo-soprano operatic soprano
September 22 – Martin Solveig,  French DJ, singer, songwriter and record producer.
 September 23 – Sarah Blasko, Australian singer/songwriter/producer
 September 25 – Santigold, American singer, producer, songwriter
October 6 
 Barbie Shu, Taiwanese actress and singer
 Yotuel Romero, Cuban singer, actor, and current lead singer and co-writer of Orishas. (Beatrix Luengo) 
October 7 – Taylor Hicks, American singer
October 19 – Omar Gooding, rapper
October 20 – Tom Wisniewski (MxPx)
October 22 – Jon Foreman, American rock singer/guitarist (Switchfoot)
November 1 – Cosima De Vito, Australian soul singer
November 2 – Mike Leon Grosch, German singer
November 11 – Jesse F. Keeler (Death from Above 1979)
November 12 – Tevin Campbell, singer-songwriter
November 13 – Shagrath, Dimmu Borgir
November 16 – Mario Barravecchia, Italian singer
November 18 – Shagrath, Norwegian black metal musician (Dimmu Borgir)
November 19 – Jun Shibata, Japanese singer and songwriter
November 26 – Jean Grae, an American hip hop recording artist, actress, and comedia
November 29 – Anna Faris, American actress, producer, model, comedian and singer
December 4 – Amie Comeaux, American country music singer (d. 1997)
December 12 – Dan Hawkins, British rock guitarist (The Darkness)
December 17 -Tiki Taane, New Zealand-based musician, experimentalist, musical activist, producer, and live engineer. 
December 18 – Red Café (Jermaine Denny), rapper
December 23 – Amjad Sabri, Qawwali singer (murdered 2016)
December 25
Tuomas Holopainen, Finnish metal keyboardist (Nightwish)
Armin van Buuren, Dutch music producer and DJ
December 28 - Eric Griffin,  American heavy metal and rock guitarist.date unknown''
Philip Howard, pianist and composer
John Collura (The Ataris)
Patrick Riley (The Ataris)
 Milosh, Canadian EDM star, (formerly married to Alexa Nikolas)

Deaths
January 8 – George Baker, singer, 90
January 10 – Howlin' Wolf, blues musician, 65
January 16 – Vasco Campagnano, operatic tenor, 65
January 18 – Friedrich Hollaender, composer, 79
January 23 – Paul Robeson, singer, 77
January 25 – Chris Kenner, American singer-songwriter, 46 (heart attack)
January 29 – Jesse Fuller, blues musician, 79
January 30 – Mance Lipscomb, blues musician, 80
January 31 – Evert Taube, composer and singer, 85
February 5 – Rudy Pompilli, saxophone player and 20-year member of Bill Haley & His Comets, 50 (lung cancer)
February 6 – Vince Guaraldi, jazz musician and pianist, 47
February 9 – Percy Faith, bandleader and composer, 67
February 12 – Sal Mineo, actor and singer, 37 (murdered)
February 13 – Lily Pons, coloratura soprano, 77
February 22 – Florence Ballard, The Supremes, 32 (coronary thrombosis)
February 25 – Tarquinia Tarquini, operatic soprano, 93
March 14 – Busby Berkeley, musical director and choreographer, 80
March 19 – Paul Kossoff, guitarist, (Free), 25 (cerebral and pulmonary oedema)
March 25 – Maria Zamboni, operatic soprano, 80
March 26 – Duster Bennett, blues musician, 29 (car accident)
April 9 – Phil Ochs, protest singer, 35 (suicide)
April 14 – Erna Ellmenreich, operatic soprano, 90
April 25 – Alexander Brailowsky, pianist, 80
May 12 – Rudolf Kempe, conductor, 65
May 14 – Keith Relf, vocalist (The Yardbirds), 35 (cardiac arrest due to electrocution)
May 15 – David Munrow, early music performer, 33 (suicide)
May 21 – Harold Blair, operatic tenor, 51
May 26 – Maggie Teyte, operatic soprano, 88
June 6 – Elisabeth Rethberg, operatic soprano, 81
June 25 – Johnny Mercer, singer and songwriter, 66
June 28
Malcolm Lockyer, film composer and conductor, 52
Yakov Zak, pianist and music teacher, 62
August 2 – Cecilia (singer), Spanish singer-songwriter, 27 (road accident)
August 6 – Gregor Piatigorsky, Russian cellist, 73
August 24 – Michael Head, composer, 76
August 26 – Lotte Lehmann, opera singer, 88
August 27 – Mukesh, Indian singer, 53 (heart attack)
August 29 – Jimmy Reed, US blues musician, 50
September 26 – L.C. Robinson, US blues musician, 61
October 3 – Victoria Spivey, US singer, pianist and composer, 69
October 11
Connee Boswell, US singer, member of the Boswell Sisters, 68
Alfredo Bracchi, Italian lyricist, 78
Werner Haas, pianist, 45 (car accident)
October 21 – Jean Berveiller, organist and composer, 73
November 12 – Walter Piston, composer, 82
December 4
Benjamin Britten, composer, 63
Tommy Bolin, guitarist, 25 (drug-induced suffocation)
December 6 – Raymond Hanson, composer, 63
December 28 – Freddie King, blues musician, 42
Date Unknown – Patrick Kelly, Irish folk fiddler

Awards

Grammy Awards
 Grammy Awards of 1976

Country Music Association Awards

Eurovision Song Contest
 Eurovision Song Contest 1976

References 

 
20th century in music
Music by year